Aybak, also transliterated as Aibak, Aibek, or Aybeg may refer to:

People

 Izz al-Din Aybak (r. 1250), ruler of Egypt
 Qutb-Ud-Din Aybak (r. 1206–1211), ruler of Delhi Sultanate in India
 Aibeg (13th century), Mongol ambassador
 Saifuddin Aibak (g. 1232–1236), governor of Bengal
 Awar Khan Aibak (g. 1236), governor of Bengal

Places

 Aybak, Samangan, a town in Afghanistan
 Aybak District, a district in Afghanistan
 Haibak, a town in Afghanistan
 Aybak, Helmand, a village in Afghanistan

See also 
 Aibak (disambiguation)
 Aïbeg and Serkis